Paroedura masobe, also called masobe gecko, is an endangered species of reptile from the genus of geckos. They are the most abundant species in the Gecko family and are known for their white-speckled dark skin and big eyes. The average life span of the Paroedura masobe is approximately eight years.

Lizards in the genus of the Paroedura are the most deceptive in comparison to nocturnal geckos in the region of Madagascar. This rare species are mainly kept and bred in captivity by scientists who engage in herpetoculture. Gunther was the first to describe this genus on the discovery of the P. sanctijohannis. Later Dixon and Kroll discovered nine species of Paroedura. They identified features that diagnosed the group of Gunthers leaf-toed forms. These features included the coossification of the skin to the underlying skull, fused nasal bones, paired parietal bones, and the absence of the second epibranchial element of the hyoid apparatus. An additional six species were identified by Nussbaum and Raxworthy. Lastly, Glaw identified a fifteenth species.

Classification 
The Gekkonidae family is a highly diverse lizard family. The family is often described in the squamation taxonomy category. The paroedura masobe is one of the twenty-two species of the genus. Nine species were identified by Dixon and Kroll and fourteen species were identified by Nussbaum and Raxworthy. The Paroedura has recently experienced an increase in species diversity due to the discovery of the paroedura neglecta. The taxonomic classification of the Gekkondiae family which is described under the genus of Paroedura was recently modified to the exact date of June 12, 2018. The family now currently contains 24 species spread across Madagascar and the Comoro Islands.

Phylogeny

Genera 
 Paroedura androyensis (Grandidier, 1867)
 Paroedura bastardi (Mocquard, 1900)
 Paroedura fasciata (Glaw, J. Kohler & Vences, 2018)
 Paroedura gracilis (Boulenger, 1896)
 Paroedura guibeae (Dixon & Kroll, 1974)
 Paroedura homalorhina (Angel, 1936)
 Paroedura hordiesi (Glaw, Rosler, Ineich, Gehring, J. Kohler & Vences, 2014)
 Paroedura ibityensis (Rosler & Kruger, 1998)
 Paroedura karstophila (Nussbaun & Raxworthy, 2000)
 Paroedura Kloki (Glaw, J. Kohler & Vences, 2018)
 Paroedura lohatsara (Glaw, Vences & K. Schmidt, 2001)
 Paroedura maingoka (Nussbaun & Raxworthy, 2000)
 Paroedura masobe (Nussbaum & Raxworthy, 1994)
 Paroedura neglecta (J. Kohler, Vences, Scherz & Glaw, 2019)
 Paroedura oviceps (Boettger, 1881)
 Paroedura picta (W. Peters, 1854)
 Paroedura rennerae (Miralles, Bruy, Crottini, Rakotoarison, Roatsoavina, Sherz, R. Schmidt, J. KOhler, Glaw & Vences, 2021)
 Paroedura sanctijohannis (Gunther, 1879)
 Paroedura spelaea (Glaw, J. KOhler & Vences, 2018)
 Paroedura stellata (Hawlitschek & Glaw, 2012)
 Paroedura stumpffi (Boettger, 1879)
 Paroedura tanjaka (Nussbaum & Raxworthy, 2000)
 Paroedura vahiny (Nussbaum & Raxworthy, 2000)
 Paroedura vazimba (Nussbaum & Raxworthy, 2000)

Ecology

Habitat 
The habitat for the paroedura masobe is classified as a low elevation humid primary forest. The area is active on vegetation and inhabits leaves that are located one to four meters above the ground. This species is endemic to Madagascar, where it is known from low elevation sites in the north of the Zahamena-Ankeniheny Corridor (Glaw and Vences 2007). It is currently found in only two places and has been found as recently as 2010 in Betampona (F. Andreone pers. comm. January 2011).

Distribution 
The paroedura genus overall range is in the two locations of Madagascar and the Comoro Islands. Two species were found in the Comoro Islands and sixteen species were found spread across Madagascar. It is not common for the species to appear farther than the known distribution of these sites. Due to the scarcity of a suitable habitat the distributional extent in this area is approximately below . It occurs from  asl. They are very rare to encounter due to the pressure and rough distribution of the forest habitat within the range of the gecko's. The species population is decreasing in result, it has a severely fragmented population.

Diet 

The species diet consists mostly of crickets, but the female masobes diet includes land snails and isopods (wood lice). Roaches are often incorporated into the diet but they must be the size of a large cricket. The females benefit greatly from this diet because of the increase of calcium. Young masobes should be fed around four to five insects every day. While adult masobes should be fed four to six times per week. Females that are ready to breed should be fed isopods or land snails at least twice a month. During hunting, overly large animals or very small prey are often ignored.

Behavior

Reproduction 
There are many patterns in the Gekkonidae family in relation to reproduction. There is evidence of these reproduction patterns by the presence of oviparous and viviparous species.  Geckos have a set of reproductive oviducts which are derived from the embryonic paramesonephric ducts. Oviducts are a pair of organs that are made with morphologically distinct segments which can include small variations between each species. They play a very important role in reproduction. The oviducts in reptiles have four or five divisions that are made up of the infundibulum, isthmus, vagina, uterus, and uterine tube. In oviparous species such as the paroedura masobe, an important function is protection of the eggshells in the oviducts. Not only does oviducts provide eggshell protection, but they also contribute to reproduction variation within the gecko species. For example, some Gekkonidae familys use the oviducts to store sperm which dissociates the sperm from fertilization.

Conservation

Threats 
This species is threatened by low elevation humid forest into farmland and the removal of timber. The extraction of honey and other biological resources also degrades the forest which results in the species' ability to persevere. The international pet trade may also become a major threat to the species, if not controlled.

Efforts 
The current efforts to save the parodura masobe are very small. There is protection against the environment that the species inhabits which includes the conservation sites being identifies and 100 percent of the species population being protected by PAs. Currently, there is no research or monitoring for the species being conducted. There is no area based regional management plan or success in reintroduced/introduced benignly. The physical efforts to save this species are almost non-existent. For example, there are no awareness programs or international legislation efforts. Protection of the species habitat needs to be strictly enforced and trade needs to be monitored. The conversation of this species demands more research to be conducted with the population trends of the parodura masobe.

References

Paroedura
Reptiles of Madagascar
Reptiles described in 1994